von Ubisch is a German surname. Notable people with the surname include:

 Gerta von Ubisch (1882–1965), German geneticist
 Leopold von Ubisch (1886–1965), German zoologist

German-language surnames